The liver of mammals, fowl, and fish is commonly eaten as food by humans (see offal). Pork, lamb, veal, beef, chicken, goose, and cod livers are widely available from butchers and supermarkets while stingray and burbot livers are common in some European countries.

Animal livers are rich in iron, copper, the B vitamins and preformed vitamin A.  Daily consumption of liver can be harmful; for instance, vitamin A toxicity has been proven to cause medical issues to babies born of pregnant mothers who consumed too much vitamin A. A single serving of beef liver exceeds the tolerable upper intake level of vitamin A. 100 g cod liver contains 5 mg of vitamin A and 100 µg of vitamin D. Liver contains large amounts of vitamin B12, and this was one of the factors that led to the discovery of the vitamin.

Etymology 

From Middle English liver, from Old English , from Proto-Germanic , from Proto-Indo-European  "to smear, smudge, stick", from Proto-Indo-European - "to be slimy, be sticky, glide". Cognate with Saterland Frisian  "liver", West Frisian  "liver", Dutch  "liver", German  "liver", Danish , Norwegian and Swedish language lever "liver" the last three from Old Norse  "liver".

In the Romance languages, the anatomical word for "liver" (French , Italian , Spanish , etc.) derives not from the Latin anatomical term, but from the culinary term , literally "stuffed with figs," referring to the livers of geese that had been fattened on figs (foie gras).

Preparation 
Liver can be baked, boiled, broiled, fried, stir-fried, or eaten raw (asbeh nayeh or sawda naye in Lebanese cuisine, liver sashimi). In many preparations, pieces of liver are combined with pieces of meat or kidneys, like in the various forms of Middle Eastern mixed grill (e.g. meurav Yerushalmi). Spreads or pâtés made from liver have various names, including liver pâté, pâté de foie gras, chopped liver, liverwurst, liver spread, and Braunschweiger. Other liver sausages include mazzafegato or salsiccia matta. A traditional South African delicacy, namely skilpadjies, is made of minced lamb's liver wrapped in netvet (caul fat), and grilled over an open fire.

There has been a growing popularity of consuming liver as jerky or as supplements in capsules due to its nutritious density.

Fish liver 
Some fish livers are valued as food, especially the stingray liver. It is used to prepare delicacies, such as poached skate liver on toast in England, as well as the beignets de foie de raie and foie de raie en croute in French cuisine. Cod liver (usually tinned in its oil and served seasoned) is a popular spread for bread or toast in several European countries. In Russia, it is served with potatoes. Cod liver oil is commonly used as a dietary supplement. Liver of burbot is eaten in Finland: it is common for fish vendors and supermarket fish aisles to sell these fish with liver and roe sacks still attached. These parts are often eaten boiled or added to burbot soup. Burbot and its liver are a traditional winter food.

Poisoning 

The livers of polar bears, walruses, bearded seals, moose, and huskies can contain very high levels of preformed vitamin A, and their consumption has led to vitamin A poisoning (hypervitaminosis A) according to several anecdotal reports. The Inuit will not eat the liver of polar bears or bearded seals. It has been estimated that consumption of 500 grams of polar bear liver would result in a toxic dose for a human. Russian sailor Alexander Konrad, who accompanied explorer Valerian Albanov in a tragic ordeal over the Arctic ice in 1912, wrote about the awful effects of consuming polar bear liver. Also, in 1913, Antarctic explorers on the Far Eastern Party Douglas Mawson and Xavier Mertz were believed to have been poisoned, the latter fatally, from eating husky liver, though this has been contested recently.

Mercury content in some species can also be an issue. In 2012, the Government of Nunavut warned pregnant women to lower their intake of ringed seal liver due to elevated levels of mercury.

The neurotoxin in the liver of the pufferfish (which is consumed in Japanese cuisine as fugu, tightly regulated by Japanese law) contains the highest concentration of the tetrodotoxin, which characterizes the species. Consequently, the liver has been illegal to serve since 1984.

Traditions
Pig liver is a traditional food of immigrant Okinawans in Hawaii. It used to be eaten on New Year's Eve.

References 

 
German cuisine
Greek cuisine
Mexican cuisine
Philippine cuisine
South African cuisine
Offal